This is a list of musical compositions by Antonio Salieri (August 18, 1750 – May 7, 1825), organized by genre. Together, the opus consists of approximately 652 works.

Secular vocal music

Operas 

 La Vestale
 L'amore innocente
 Don Chisciotte alle nozze di Gamace
 La moda, ossia scompigli domestici
 Armida
 La fiera di Venezia
 Il barone di Rocca antica
 La secchia rapita
 La locandiera
 La calamita de' cuori
 La finta scema
 Daliso e Delmita
 Europa riconosciuta
 La scuola de' gelosi
 La partenza inaspettata
 Il talismano
 La dama pastorella 
 Semiramide 
 Les Danaïdes
 Il ricco d'un giorno
 La grotta di Trofonio
 Prima la musica e poi le parole
 Les Horaces
 Tarare
 Axur, re d'Ormus
 Cublai gran kan de' Tartari
 Il pastor fido dramma 
 La cifra
 Catilina
 Il mondo alla rovescia 
 Eraclito e Democrito  
 Palmira, regina di Persia
 Il moro 
 I tre filosofi
 Falstaff, ossia Le tre burle
 Cesare in Farmacusa 
 L'Angiolina ossia Il matrimonio per Susurro 
 Annibale in Capua 
 La bella  
 Die Neger

Insertion arias and ensembles 

 "Addio carina bella" (Meng.) aria in G major for bass and orchestra, for?
 "Affé questa sera grandissima" - "Una domina? Una nipote?" (Don Anchise) arie & recitative for bass and orchestra (1775?), for P. Anfossi's "La finta giardiniera"?
 "Ah ciel che noja è questa" - fragment -
 "Ah dove amici" recitative for soprano and orchestra, for?
 "Ah non siete ogni si facile" (Tenast) aria for tenor and orchestra, for?
 "Alla speranza" (Galatea) aria for soprano and Orchestra, for?
 "All'idea del gran mistero" aria in A major for soprano, choir and orchestra, for?
 "Anch'io nello specchio talora" aria in E major for soprano and orchestra (1771), for?
 "Cedo l'intatto pegno" (Dely - Davidde) duet for  soprano, tenor and orchestra, for?
 "Che mi s'appresti?" (Capitano) aria in C major for bass and orchestra (1775), for?
 "[...] che strane vicende" (Ros. - Fior. - Pasq. - Fulg.) fragmentary finale of an opera (Atto II), for A. Felici's "La novità"?
 "Chi vuol la zingara" Duett für zwei Soprane und Orchester, für?
 "Dall'uso parigino il bello, il sopraffino" aria in C major for soprano and orchestra (1773), for?
 "Del morir le angoscie adesso" scene and aria for tenor and orchestra
 "Denke nicht der Zeit der Schmerzen" duet for soprano, tenor and orchestra, for?
 "Dico sol, che la padrona" (Lena) aria for soprano and orchestra, for "La Locandiera"?
 "D'oro saranno i letti" (Fulg.) aria in D major for bass and orchestra (1775), for?
 "Dottorini saputelli" (Clar.) arie for soprano and orchestra (1774), for?
 "Eccomi al punto ch'io già tanta temei" fragmentary aria for soprano and orchestra, for?
 "Fate largo al gran Pasquino" (Pasquino) aria in D major for bass and orchestra (1775), for A. Felici's "La novità"?
 "Figlia mia diletta" trio for soprano, tenor, bass and orchestra, for?
 "Fra tanto pietre brune" (Polidoro) recitative for bass and orchestra (1785?), für D. Cimarosa's "L'Italiana in Londra"?
 "Goder lasciatemi" (Gianetta) aria for soprano and orchestra, for?
 "Gran diavolo!" (Uberto) aria in F major for bass and orchestra, for?
 "Guarda in quel volto" aria in E flat major for soprano and orchestra, for?
 "Ho perduto la mia pace" (Brettone) aria for tenor and orchestra (1775), for G. Paisiello's "L'innocenza fortunata"?
 "Ho stampato libri in foglio" aria for tenor and orchestra, for?
 "Il pargoletto amabile" aria in A major for tenor and orchestra, for?
 "In tuo favore mi parla il core" duet for two sopranos and orchestra, for?
 "Io contento", recitative, for?
 "Io di nuovo vel ripeto" aria for soprano and orchestra (1777), for?
 "Io lo dico e il posso dire" trio for alto, tenor, bass and orchestra, for?
 "Io non so che pensare" recitative and cavatina for tenor and orchestra, for?
 "La donna è sempre instabile" (Belfusio) aria for tenor and orchestra, for "La fiera di Venezia"?
 "La mia morosa me l'ha fatta" (Sandrina) aria for soprano and orchestra, for "Il talismano"?
 "L'amour est un dieu" Canzone for soprano and orchestra, for?
 "La sposa se cedo" aria for soprano and orchestra, for?
 "Le diras, che il campione" (Gusman) aria for bass and orchestra (1775), for?
 "Le Inconvenienze teatrali" quartet for soprano, alto, tenor, bass and orchestra, for?
 "L'introduco immantinente" - "Quando ho visto il dottorino" (Rosina) recitative and aria for soprano and orchestra (1776), for "La finta scema"
 "Madame vezzosissima" (Zeffirina - Valerio) fragmentary recitative and duet, for?
 "Ma quai mali intorno al core" aria for tenor and orchestra
 "Ma quale agli occhi miei" (Conte) recitative, for?
 "Mia vaga Dorilla" aria for Bass and orchestra (1775), for B. Galuppi's "Il marchese villano"
 "Moriam, moriam mia vita" recitative and duet for soprano, tenor and orchestra, for?
 "Nel mio seno" aria, for?
 "Non per parlar d'amore" (Laurina) aria in E flat major for soprano and orchestra, for N. Piccinni's "L'astretta"
 "Non temer che d'altri" (Falsirena) aria for soprano and orchestra (1779), for "La fiera di Venezia"
 "Non veste alla moda" (Aga.) aria for bass and orchestra (1774), for?
 "Non vi fidate" aria for soprano and orchestra, for?
 "Oh che donna che matta" (Peppino), recitative, for?
 "Oh me infelice - Allor potrei" recitative and aria, for?
 "Oh qual sorpasso giubilo" (Pilemone) aria in F major für bass and orchestra, for "Eraclito e Democrito"?
 "Oh quanti veggarsi" (Cardano) aria for tenor and orchestra, for "Il talismano"?
 "Oh sancte inviete" aria for soprano and orchestra (1775), for?
 "Padrona stimatissima" (Pasquino) aria in D major for bass and orchestra, for A. Felici's "La novità"?
 "Parlaste d'un cappone" aria for bass and orchestra (1776), for?
 "Pasquino avrà quest'ora" recitative, for A. Felici's "La novità"?
 "Paterio giudizio" aria for bass and orchestra, for?
 "Per amore io già vancillo" (Perillo) aria for tenor and orchestra (1770), for?
 "Perder sogetto amato" duet for two sopranos and orchestra, for?
 "Per voi s'avanzi" aria for bass and orchestra, for?
 "Qual densa notte" (Artalice - Chabri - Nehemia - Chor) finale of an opera, for?
 "Quando sarà mia sposa" (Capitano) aria for bass and orchestra (1775), for?
 "Quest'è un mar di confusione" quartet for sopran, alto, tenor, bass and orchestra, for?
 "Rasserena nel tuo barbaro" fragmentary aria, for?
 "Sans argent et sans crédit" (Boschetto - Pirati - Lauretta) scene with orchestra (1768), for?
 "Scomodarmi da palazzo e trattarmi in questa guisa" aria in F major for soprano and orchestra (1775), for?
 "Se amor m'ha dato in testa, se mi far delirare" aria for soprano and orchestra (1776), for?
 "Se credessi di volare" (Peppino) aria in E flat major for bass and orchestra (1774), for?
 "Se Dio veder tu vuoi" (Achio - Azia) duet, for?
 "Se tu vedessi il core" (Isabella) aria in G major for soprano and strings, for B. Galuppi's "Il villano geloso"
 "Signor mio scrivete bene" (Pasquino) aria in F major for bass and orchestra (1775), for A. Felici's "La novità"?
 "S'odo, o duce" (Epponina - Voadice - Sabino - Arminio - Annio) finale of an opera (1785?), for G. Sarti's "Giulio Sabino"
 "Son dama, ma so l'arte ancor delle plebe" (Polissena) aria in B flat major for soprano and orchestra (1774), for G. Paisiello's "Il tamburo (notturno)"
 "Son nipote d'un togato" (Isabella) aria in F major for soprano and strings, for B. Galuppi's "Il villano geloso"
 "Talor non si comprende" aria for bass and orchestra, for?
 "Tenero cor" recitative and cavatina for soprano and orchestra (1780), for?
 "Tu che ferita sei" aria for tenor and orchestra, for "Il barone di Rocca antica"?
 "Tutte le furie unite in questo petto io sento" aria for soprano and orchestra (1776), for?
 "Tutti dicon che la moglie" aria for bass and orchestra, for?
 "Una domina? una nipote?" - see: aria "Affé questa saria grandissima" -
 "Un bel marito" aria for soprano and orchestra, for?
 "Un pescatore mi pare amore" aria for bass and orchestra, for?
 "Vedi ben che queste scene" trio for soprano, alto, bass and orchestra, for?
 "Venga su la finestra" aria for tenor, choir and orchestra, for?
 "Venissi cari, l'affare è serio" (Patenio) aria for bass and orchestra (1777), for?
 "Verdammter Streich" (Mauser) aria for tenor and orchestra, for?
 "[...] vicino a perdere l'amato ben" fragmentary aria, for?
 "Villottino mio bellino" (Lisetta) aria for alto and orchestra (1775), for?
 aria (Polissena) for soprano and orchestra (1774), for G. Paisiello's "Il tamburo (notturno)"
 finale of an opera for three sopranos, two tenors, bass and orchester (1779), for "La scuola de'gelosi"?

Ballets and incidental music 
 Ballet in 7 movements for "L'Europa riconosciuta" (1778)
 Ballet in 16 movements	
 Ballet in 10 movements	
 Ballet in 8 movements	
 Fragmentary ballet
 Overture, four incidental pieces and nine choirs for "Die Hussiten vor Naumburg" by August von Kotzebue (1803)

Secular cantatas 
 "Cantata per le nozze di Francesco I" for soloists, choir and orchestra (1808)
 "Der Tyroler Landsturm" for soprano, alto, tenor, bass, double choir, orchestra and speaker (1799)
 "Die vier Tageszeiten" for choir and orchestra (1819)
 "Du, dieses Bundes Fels" for choir and orchestra	
 "Habsburg" for tenor, bass, choir and orchestra (1805/06)	
 "Il Trionfo della Gloria e della Virtù" for two sopranos, tenor, choir and orchestra (1774 or 1775)	
 "La Riconoscenza" for soprano, choir of five voices and orchestra (1796)	
 "La Riconoscenza de' Tirolesi" for choir and Orchester (1800)	
 "La Sconfitta di Borea" for soloists, choir and orchestra (1774 or 1775)	
 "Lasset uns nahen alle" for tenor, bass, choir and Orchester	
 "Le Jugement dernier" for tenor, choir and orchestra (1787/88)
 "L'Oracolo muto" for soloists, choir and orchestra (1802/03)
 "Wie eine purpur Blume" for two sopranos, choir and orchestra

Secular choirs 
 "An den erwünschten Frieden im Jahr 1814" for choir and orchestra (1814)
 "An die Religion" for choir a cappella (1814) - there is also a version for SATB choir with basso continuo. This work was intended for choir and orchestra, but in manuscript, only 1st Violin part is noted occasionally.
 "Bei Gelegenheit des Friedens" for soprano solo, tenor, bass and orchestra (1800)
 "Beide reichen Dir die Hand" for choir - fragment -
 "Del redentore lo scempio" for choir and orchestra (ca. 1805)
 "Der Vorsicht Gunst beschütze, beglücktes Österreich, dich" for choir and orchestra (1813) - new version of the final movement of "Der Tyroler Landsturm" (1799) -
 "Dio serva Francesco" for choir and orchestra
 "Do re mi fa" for choir a cappella (1818)
 "Es schallen die Töne" for choir and orchestra
 "Herzliche Empfindung bey dem so lange ersehnten und nun hergestellten Frieden im Jahr 1814" for choir and orchestra (1814)
 "O Friede, reich am Heil des Herrn" - see: "Herzliche Empfindung bey dem so lange ersehnten und nun hergestellten Frieden im Jahr 1814" -
 "Hinab in den Schoß der Amphitrite" for choir and orchestra (from "Danaus"?)
 "Il piacer la gioia" for choir and orchestra
 "Ogni bosco, ogni pendice" for choir and orchestra
 "Religion, Du Himmelstochter" - see: "An die Religion" -
 "Schweb herab, o holder Seraph Friede" - see: "An den erwünschten Frieden im Jahr 1814" -
 "Schwer lag auf unserem Vaterlande" - see: "Rückerinnerung der Deutschen nell'anno 1813" -
 "Rückerinnerung der Deutschen nell'anno 1813" for choir and orchestra (1813/14)
Songs, ensembles and canons with or without piano - approximately 340 works -

Sacred vocal music

Oratories and sacred cantatas 
 "Davidde" for soloists, choir and orchestra (1791) - fragment -
 "Gesù al limbo" for soloists, choir and orchestra (1803)
 "La passione di Gesù Cristo" for soloists, choir and Orchester (1776)
 "Le Jugement dernier" for tenor, choir and orchestra (1787/88) - see above -
 "Saul" for soloists, choir and orchestra (1791) - fragment -

Masses and single movements 
 Mass in C major for choir a Cappella (1767) - also known as "Missa Stylo a Cappella" -
 Mass in D major for choir and orchestra (1788) - called "Hofkapellmeistermesse" -
 Mass in C major for double choir and orchestra (1799) - called "Proklamationsmesse" -
 Mass in D minor for soloists, choir and orchestra (1805)
 Mass in B flat major for soloists, choir and orchestra (1809)
 Kyrie in C major for soloists, choir and orchestra (1812) - part of an unfinished mass -
 Kyrie in F major for choir and orchestra - a fragment -

Requiem masses 
 Requiem in c minor for soloists, choir and orchestra (1804)
 Requiem in d minor for choir and orchestra (c. 1815–20) - fragment -

Graduals 
 "Ad te levavi animam meam" in E flat major for choir and orchestra
 "A solis ortu" pro Festo SS. Corporis Christi, in C major for choir and orchestra (1810)
 "Benedicam Dominum" pro Dominica 12ma post Pentecostem aut de Tempore, in B flat major for choir and orchestra
 "Improperium" in c minor for choir a Cappella (1810)
 "Justorum animae" in A major for choir and orchestra
 "Liberasti nos, Domine" pro Dominica XXIII. et ultima post Pentecostem, in D major for choir and orchestra (1799)
 "Magna opera Domini" da tempore, in D major for choir and orchestra (1810)
 "Spiritus meus" in d minor for choir and orchestra (1820)
 "Tres sunt, qui testimonium dant in coelo" de SS. Trinitate, in D major for choir and orchestra
 "Veni Sancte Spiritus" in B flat major for choir and orchestra (1800)
 "Veni Sancte Spiritus" pro Festo Pentecostem, in B flat major for choir and orchestra (1805)
 "Venite gentes" in C major for double choir and orchestra (1799)
 "Vox tua mi Jesu" in C major for choir and orchestra (1774)

Offertories 
 "Alleluja (deinde) Bonum est" in D major for choir, strings and organ
 "Alleluja" in D major for choir and orchestra (1774) - 1788 reused as "Amen"-Fugue in the "Gloria" of the Mass in D major -
 "Assumpta est Maria" in C major for choir and orchestra (1799)
 "Audite vocem magnam" in C major for Chor und orchestra (1809)
 "Beatus vir, qui non abit" in D major for soloists, choir and orchestra
 "Benedixisti Domine" in F major for choir a cappella
 "Benedixisti Domine" in F major for choir a cappella
 "Cantate Domino omnis terra" in C major for double choir and orchestra (1799)
 "Confirma hoc Deus" in C major for soloists, choir and orchestra (1809)
 "Desiderium animae" in F major for soprano, alto, bass and orchestra
 "Domine, Dominus noster" in G major for choir and orchestra (1812)
 "Dum corde pio" in C major for choir, double-bass and organ
 "Excelsus super omnes gentes Dominus" in C major for choir and orchestra (1806)
 "Gloria et honor(e)" in C major for choir and orchestra (1809)
 "Jubilate Deo" in A major for choir and orchestra
 "Justus ut palma" in B flat major for choir and orchestra
 "Lauda Sion Salvatorem" in C major for choir and orchestra (1805)
 "Laudate Dominum omnes gentes" in D major for choir and orchestra (1809)
 "Magna et mirabilia sunt opera tua" in C major for choir and orchestra (1809)
 "Magna opera Domini" in C major for chor and orchestra (1812)
 "Miserere nostri" in g minor for choir and orchestra (1805)
 "Miserere nostri" in E flat major for choir and orchestra (1803)
 "O altitudo divitiarium" in C major for choir and orchestra (1809)
 "O quam bonus et suavis est" in B flat major for soloists, choir and orchestra
 "Populi timente sanctum nomen Domini" in E flat major choir and orchestra (1778)
 "Salve Regina" in D major for choir and orchestra (1815)
 "Salve Regina" (on German words) in G major for choir and organ
 "Salve Regina" in B flat major for choir and orchestra
 "Salvum fac populum" (1805) - lost -
 "Si ambulavero in medio" in g minor for choir and orchestra (1809)
 "Sub tuum praesidium" in B flat major for choir and orchestra (1820)
 "Tui sunt coeli" in C major for choir and orchestra
 "Tui sunt coeli" in E flat major for choir and orchestra

Psalms 
 "Beatus vir, qui timet Dominum" in D major for two tenors, choir and orchestra
 "Confitebor Domine" in B flat major for choir and orchestra
 "De profundis" in f minor for choir, bass and organ (1815)
 "De profundis" in g minor for choir and orchestra (1805)
 "Dixit Dominus" in G major for choir and orchestra
 "Lauda, Jerusalem, Dominum" in C major for choir and orchestra (1815)
 "Laudate pueri Dominum" in G major for choir of six voices and orchestra

Canticles
 "Magnificat" in C major for choir and orchestra (1815)
 "Magnificat" in F major for two-part choir and orchestra (1815)

Litanies 
 "Litania di B.M.V." in F major for soloists, choir and orchestra
 "Litania pro Sabbato Sancto" in B flat major for choir a cappella (1820)

Hymns 
 "Coelestis urbs Jerusalem" Hymnus de dedicatione Ecclesiae, in A major for choir and orchestra
 "Genitori" in F major for soprano, choir and orchestra
 "In te Domine speravi" in E flat major for two sopranos and bass (1817)
 "Tantum ergo" in C major for double choir, two clarinets, four horns, four trumpets (Clarini), timpani, double-bass and organ
 "Tantum ergo" in C major for choir, two oboes, two bassoons, four trumpets (Clarini), timpani and organ
 "Tantum ergo" in C major for choir, two trumpets (Clarini), timpani and organ
 "Tantum ergo" in F major for soprano and strings (1768)
 "Te Deum laudamus" in C major for soloists, choir and orchestra (1819)
 "Te Deum laudamus" de Incoronazione, in D major for choir and orchestra (1790)
 "Te Deum laudamus" in D major for double choir and orchestra (1799) - new version of the "Te Deum" from 1790 -

Introitus 
 "Avertisti captivitatem Jacob" pro Dominica XXIII. et XXIV. post Pentecostem, in B flat major for choir, strings and organ
 "Beati immaculati" de Virginibus et Martyribus et de Sancto Stephano, in F major for choir, strings and organ
 "Concupiscit et deficit" in dedicatione Ecclesia et in Festo Tranfigurationis Domini, in F major for choir, strings and organ
 "Dico ergo" pro Festis Beatae Mariae Virginis, in d minor for choir, strings and organ
 "Domine exaudi vocem meam" pro Dominica XXII. post Pentecostem, in F major for choir, strings and organ
 "Et justitiam tuam" pro Festo Epiphaniae, in d minor for choir, strings and organ
 "Et psallare" pro Festo S. Joannis Apost. et S. Joannis Bapt., in B flat major for choir, strings and organ
 "Inductus est Dominus" pro Dominica infra octavem Nativitas Domini et ad secundam missam, in F major for choir, strings and organ
 "In civitate" pro Festo Purificationis Mariae et Dominica VIII. post Pentecostem, in C major for choir, strings and organ
 "In mandatis ejus" de Confessore et in Festo Sancti Joachim, in g minor for choir, strings and organ
 "Jubilate Deo Jacob" pro Dominica in albis, pro Feria II. post Pentecostem et in solemnitate corporis Christi, in d minor for choir, strings and organ
 "Jubilate Deo" pro Festo St. Januarii Episcopus et Mart., pro Festo Ascensionis Domini, in F major for choir, strings and organ
 "Laetentur insulae" pro Dominica III., IV., V., VI. post Epiphaniam, in F major for choir, strings and organ
 "Ne quando taceas" pro Dominica VI. post Pentecostem, in d minor for choir, strings and organ
 "Neque celaveris" de Confessore, in B flat major for choir, strings and organ
 "Quam admirabile est nomen tuum" pro Festo Sanctissime Trinitatis, in d minor for choir, strings and organ
 "Tu cognovisti" pro Festo Sanctorum Apostolorum, in d minor for choir, strings and organ

Motets and sacred arias and chants 
 "Audimus Dei verbum" - lost -
 "Contra vos, o monstra horrenda" in B flat major, motet for soprano, choir and orchestra (1769)
 "Cor meum conturbatum" in g minor for choir and orchestra
 "Ecce enim veritatem" in G major for bass, three violas, double-bass and organ
 "Fremat tirannus" in C major, motet for soprano, choir and orchestra (1778)
 "Magna est virtus" - lost -
 "Misericordius Dominus" in E flat major, duet for soprano, bass, violine and orchestra
 "O mortales, festinate" in B flat major, aria for soprano, clarinet and orchestra
 "Quae est illa" in B flat major, aria in honorem B.V.M. for soprano, oboe, strings and organ
 "Quem terra pontus sidera" in A major for soprano and orchestra
 "Salve Jesu pie" duet - lost -
 "Tu es spes mea, Domine" for soprano, flute, oboe and orchestra

Instrumental music

Concerti 
 Concerto for oboe, violin, violoncello and orchestra in D major (1770)
 Concerto for organ and orchestra in C major (1773) - second movement lost -
 Concerto for piano and orchestra in C major (1773)	
 Concerto for piano and orchestra in B flat major (1773)	
 Concerto for flute, oboe and orchestra in C major (1774)
 Concertino da camera for flute or oboe and strings G major (1777)

Symphonies, overtures and variations 
 Symphonie in D major "Il Giorno onomastico" (1775)	
 Symphonie in D major "La Veneziana" (built from overtures to "La Scuola de'gelosi" and "La Partenza inaspettata")
 Three minuets for orchestra
 26 Variations on "La Follia di Spagna" for orchestra (1815)	
 Allegretto in D major for orchestra	
 Symphonie (ouverture) in C major - overture to "Habsburg" -
 Overture "La Frascatana"
 Fragmentary Symphonie (overture) in G major
 Fragmentary movement for bassoons and strings

Serenades 
 "Picciola Serenata" in B flat major for 2 oboes, 2 horns and bassoon (1778)
 Serenade in B flat major for 2 clarinets, 2 bassoons, 2 horns and double-bass
 Serenade in C major for 2 flutes, 2 oboes, 2 bassoons, 2 horns and double-bass (alternative version of the serenade in B flat major for seven instruments)
 Serenade in F major for 2 flutes, 2 oboes, 2 bassoons, 2 horns and double-bass
 Cassation in C major for 2 oboes, 2 English horns, 2 bassoons and 2 horns
 Three trios in G major, E flat major and C major for 2 Oboes and bassoon
 "Armonia per un tempio della notte" in E flat major for 2 oboes, 2 clarinets, 2 bassoons and 2 horns (ca. 1795)

Marches 
 11 Marches for orchestra (ca. 1804)
 March for wind ensemble "Prägt tief in eure Herzen, Brüder"
 "Parademarsch" in C major for wind ensemble
 March "Die Landwehr" (1809)
 March in honour of Gassmann in C major for orchestra (1820)

Chamber music 
 4 Scherzi armonici istrumentali for string quartet	
 Fugue for string quartet (tema H.! b.e.n. Die m. ist ein s. Ma non il testo)	
 Fugue for three instruments	
 Fugue in C major for two instruments (1818)	
 Fugue in E flat major for two instruments (Tema Kerscorchiano)
 6 little pieces for piano
 6 pieces for guitar - lost -

Revisions of other composers' works and joint compositions with other composers 
 "La Betulia liberata" by Florian Leopold Gassmann: abridgements in recitatives and arias, and additional choirs taken from other compositions of Gassmann's (1820)
 "Il Talismano": joint composition by Salieri (first act) and Giacomo Rust (second and third act) (1779)
 "Iphigénie en Tauride" by Christoph Willibald Gluck: Italian version called "Ifigenia in Tauride" in Lorenzo Da Ponte's translation (1783)
 "Per la ricuperata salute di Ofelia" for voice and piano: joint composition by Salieri, Mozart and Cornetti (1785)
 "Requiem" by Niccolò Jommelli: additional instrumentation of two oboes, two bassoons and two trombones (for Christoph Willibald Gluck's solemn requiem on April 8, 1788)
 "Stabat Mater" in F minor by Giovanni Battista Pergolesi: version for soloists, choir and orchestra, instrumentation by Franz Xaver Süssmayr

References

 
Salieri, Antonio